Marissa Meyer (born February 19, 1984) is an American novelist. A large portion of her bibliography is centered on retellings of fairy tales. She is best known for her series The Lunar Chronicles, which includes her 2012 debut novel, Cinder.

Early life and education
Meyer was born in Tacoma, Washington and attended Pacific Lutheran University, where she received a Bachelors in Creative Writing and Children's Literature. She later attended Pace University and received a Master's in Publishing. Growing up, Meyer admits that she had a strong love for fairy tales and one of her favorite shows was Sailor Moon, both of which later impacted her creation of Cinder. Meyer also says that her love of superheroes helped lead to the creation of Renegades. In an interview with Los Angeles Times, she said she attempted her first novel when she was sixteen.

Career 

Before writing Cinder, Meyer wrote Sailor Moon fan fiction for ten years under the pen name of Alicia Blade. She also wrote a novelette titled The Phantom of Linkshire Manor under her pen name. In an interview with The News-Tribune, she said that writing fan fiction helped her learn the craft of writing, gave her instant feedback and taught her how to take criticism. After graduating from college and prior to writing Cinder, Meyer worked as a book editor and a freelance typesetter and proofreader.

Meyer states that she was initially inspired to write Cinder after participating in the 2008 National Novel Writing Month contest where she wrote a story focusing on a futuristic version of Puss in Boots. The idea came from a dream where Cinderella was a cyborg and foot came off, instead of her shoe, at the ball. Meyer signed with agent Jill Grinberg, who is still her agent today. The Lunar Chronicles is a four book series with volumes based on the stories of Cinderella, Little Red Riding Hood, Rapunzel, and Snow White. The first book, Cinder, was a New York Times bestseller.  As of 2015, the series had sold over 651,000 copies. The rights to the series was optioned by Locksmith Animation for film in 2022.

In 2013, Meyer received a two-book deal from Feiwel & Friends for a young adult series featuring the Queen of Hearts from Alice in Wonderland. However, it later ended up being a standalone book called Heartless, which was released in Fall 2016. Utah students adapted the novel into a musical which Meyer attended in 2021.

Publishers Weekly announced that she would write a superhero series afterwards. The resulting trilogy of books is called Renegades, as is the first book in the series.  It was inspired by the misreading of a sign and impacted by her love of superheroes growing up. Renegades was released in the November 2017, and became the number 2 book on the New York Times bestsellers in November.

In 2020, she released a standalone rom com called Instant Karma, which was optioned for television by HBO Max in February 2021. With a Little Luck, an upcoming release, will be set in the same world as Instant Karma. 

In November 2021 she released Gilded, a novel based on the story of Rumpelstiltskin, the first in a duology.  It sold 9,000 copies in its first week, and was the top YA title when released.  The second book in the series, Cursed, was released in November 2022.

Since 2020 she has hosted The Happy Writer with Marissa Meyer, a podcast in which she interviews authors about their work.

Personal life 
Meyer is married to Jesse Taylor. In 2015, she and her husband adopted their twin daughters, Sloane and Delaney. Together, they live in Tacoma, Washington, the place where Meyer grew up. Taylor is a skilled carpenter and built Meyer a fairytale-esque writing studio in their backyard, complete with floor-to-ceiling bookshelves.

Bibliography

The Lunar Chronicles

 Cinder (2012)
 Scarlet (2013)
 Cress (2014)
 Winter (2015)

Related works
 Fairest (2015) – prequel 
 Stars Above (2016) – anthology
 Wires and Nerve, Volume 1 (2017) – graphic novel, illustrated by Douglas Holgate
 Wires and Nerve, Volume 2: Gone Rogue (2018) – graphic novel, illustrated by Stephen Gilpin
 Cinder’s Adventure: Get Me to the Wedding! (2022) - interactive ebook
 The Lunar Chronicles Coloring Book

Renegades Trilogy
 Renegades (2017)
 Archenemies (2018)
 Supernova (2019)

Standalone novels
 Heartless (2016)
 Instant Karma (2020)
 With a Little Luck (2024)

Gilded Series
 Gilded (2021)
 Cursed (2022)

Short Stories
 "Gold in the Roots of the Grass" in A Tyranny of Petticoats, edited by Jessica Spotswood (2016)
 "The Sea Witch" in Because You Love to Hate Me: 13 Tales of Villainy, edited by Amerie (2017)
 The Phantom of Linkshire Manor (2021)

Edited 

 Serendipity: Ten Romantic Works, Transformed (2022)

References

External links

 
 
 
 Marissa Meyer's Official Wattpad Profile

1984 births
Living people
American young adult novelists
American science fiction writers
Writers from Tacoma, Washington
Women writers of young adult literature
Women science fiction and fantasy writers
Writers of young adult science fiction
21st-century American novelists
21st-century American women writers
Pacific Lutheran University alumni
Novelists from Washington (state)